Peno may refer to:
Ron Peno (b. 1950s), Australian rock singer
Peno, a locality in Lamont County, Alberta, Canada
Peno, Burkina Faso, a locality in Burkina Faso not far from the town of Zangogho
Peno, Russia, an urban locality (an urban-type settlement) in Penovsky District of Tver Oblast, Russia
Lake Peno, a lake in the Valdai Hills, Russia
Stefan Peno (born 1997), Serbian basketball player